The slender racer (Orientocoluber spinalis) is a species of snake of the family Colubridae.

Geographic range
The snake is found in Asia.

References 

Colubrids
Reptiles described in 1866
Taxa named by Wilhelm Peters
Reptiles of Central Asia
Monotypic snake genera
Reptiles of China
Reptiles of Korea